The shortlisted nominees for the 2022 Governor General's Awards for Literary Merit were announced on October 12, 2022, and the winners were announced on November 16.

English

French

References

External links
Governor General's Awards

Governor General's Awards
Governor General's Awards
Governor General's Awards